is a railway station on the Kagoshima Main Line operated by JR Kyushu in Munakata, Fukuoka Prefecture, Japan. It is the nearest station to the Fukuoka University of Education (Fukuoka Kyoiku Daigaku) hence the station name which means literally "in front of the University of Education".

Lines

Layout
The station consists of two opposed side platforms serving two tracks.

Adjacent stations

History
The station was opened by JR Kyushu on 13 March 1988 as an added station on the existing Kagoshima Main Line track.

See also 
List of railway stations in Japan

References

External links
Kyōikudai-mae (JR Kyushu)

Railway stations in Fukuoka Prefecture
Railway stations in Japan opened in 1988